Augusta High School is a high school located in Augusta, Wisconsin, United States. It serves grades 9–12 and is part of the Augusta Area School District.

Athletics
Augusta High School participates in athletics as a member of the Dairyland Conference. Their athletic teams are known as the Beavers. Augusta High School won the Wisconsin Interscholastic Athletic Association Division 6 football championship in 1989.  Augusta High School won the Wisconsin Interscholastic Athletic Association Division 4 girls basketball championship in 1996, finishing the season with a record of 24–3.

References

External links
Augusta High School
Greatschools.net – Augusta High School

Public high schools in Wisconsin
Schools in Eau Claire County, Wisconsin